Monia Kari (born 14 April 1971 in Basel, Basel-Stadt) is a Tunisian discus thrower.

Her personal best throw is 61.74 metres, achieved in May 1996 in Tunis. This is the current African record.

Achievements

References

External links

1971 births
Living people
Sportspeople from Basel-Stadt
Tunisian female discus throwers
Olympic athletes of Tunisia
Athletes (track and field) at the 1996 Summer Olympics
Athletes (track and field) at the 2000 Summer Olympics
World Athletics Championships athletes for Tunisia
African Games gold medalists for Tunisia
African Games medalists in athletics (track and field)
Mediterranean Games bronze medalists for Tunisia
Mediterranean Games medalists in athletics
Athletes (track and field) at the 1995 All-Africa Games
Athletes (track and field) at the 1999 All-Africa Games
Athletes (track and field) at the 1993 Mediterranean Games
Athletes (track and field) at the 1997 Mediterranean Games
Athletes (track and field) at the 2001 Mediterranean Games
Athletes (track and field) at the 2009 Mediterranean Games
21st-century Tunisian women